Mark R. King is a New Hampshire politician.

Education
King graduated from George Mason University with an M.S. in organizational development knowledge management and a B.A. in labor studies from National Labor College in White Oak, Maryland.

Career
On November 8, 2016, King was elected to the New Hampshire House of Representatives where he represents the Hillsborough 33 district. King assumed office in 2016. King is a Democrat. King endorsed Bernie Sanders in the 2020 Democratic Party presidential primaries.

Personal life
King resides in Nashua, New Hampshire.

References

Living people
People from Nashua, New Hampshire
George Mason University alumni
Democratic Party members of the New Hampshire House of Representatives
21st-century American politicians
Year of birth missing (living people)